William Haydn Flood (1830 – 17 July 1908) was an English organist and composer, who moved to New Zealand.

Background
He married twice:
Firstly, Mary Ann Turner on 12 May 1856
Secondly Anne Catherine Juliette Groube on 5 September 1865 in New Zealand.

He served in the 1st Regiment of Life Guards and was present at the funeral of the Duke of Wellington..

He moved to New Zealand in the early 1860s. In 1867 he was appointed conductor of the Wanganui Choral Society.

His military career continued in New Zealand where he served with the Wanganui Cavalry in the Maori War.

He was declared bankrupt in 1885 and was later taken to court for failing to provide for his wife and his children.

He died on 17 July 1908 in Wellington, New Zealand.

Appointments

Organist at St Mary Redcliffe, Bristol 1855 – 1862
Organist of St. Joseph’s Church, Dunedin
Organist of Christ Church, Wanganui
Organist of St. Mary’s Church, New Plymouth
Organist of Holy Trinity Church, Gisborne, New Zealand 1884 - ????

Compositions

He composed works for organ and choir.

References

1830 births
1908 deaths
English organists
British male organists
English composers
New Zealand classical organists
New Zealand composers
English male composers
English emigrants to New Zealand
19th-century British composers
19th-century English musicians
19th-century British male musicians
Male classical organists
19th-century organists